The  was the Hojo's attack to Takeda army, took place at Mimase pass in 1569, as the forces of Takeda Shingen withdrew from repeated failed sieges of the Hōjō clan's Odawara Castle in the Kanagawa Prefecture of Japan. 

The Hōjō forces, led by the brothers Ujiteru and Ujikuni, lay in wait for Takeda Shingen in the pass of Mimase. The Takeda vanguard, which included Baba Nobuharu, was hard-pressed. Shingen himself led up the Takeda main body.

The battle turned in favor of the Takeda when Yamagata Masakage launched a furious counterattack, inflicting heavy casualties on the Hôjô and forced the Hôjô army to retreat north, allowing the Takeda return to Kai — leaving behind some 900 dead.

See also 

 Myōki

References

Turnbull, Stephen (1998). The Samurai Sourcebook. London: Cassell & Co.

1569 in Japan
Mimasetoge
Mimasetoge
Aikawa, Kanagawa